The Ukelayat (Koryak: Вуквылгаят) is a river in Kamchatka Krai, Russia.

The name of the river comes from the Koryak "vukvylgayat" (Вуквылгаят), meaning "rock/fall".

Course
The Ukelayat has its source in the Koryak Highlands. It is fed by glaciers of the northern slopes of the adjoining ranges. It flows roughly eastwards within a valley bound by the Pikas Range to the north and the Ukelayat Range to the south. The river divides into channels along its middle and lower course. Its mouth is in the small Dezhnyov Bay of the Bering Sea.

Flora and fauna
The river basin is characterized by tundra vegetation, including mosses, lichens, dwarf shrubs, and sedges.

See also
Bering tundra
List of rivers of Russia

References

External links
 The Penzhina-West Kamchatka folded zone and the Ukelayat-Sredinnyi block in the structure of the Koryak Highland and Kamchatka
 Kamchatka Krai travel guide

Rivers of Kamchatka Krai
Koryak Mountains